Franklin Leo Kury (born October 15, 1936) is a former member of the Pennsylvania State Senate, serving from 1973 to 1980.  He also served in the Pennsylvania House of Representatives.

References

Democratic Party Pennsylvania state senators
Democratic Party members of the Pennsylvania House of Representatives
Living people
1936 births
People from Sunbury, Pennsylvania